Monika Pedersen (21 December 1978) is a Danish singer of the band Sinphonia and former vocalist of "The World State" and the Norwegian gothic metal band Sirenia, replacing Henriette Bordvik. She also contributed guest vocals to Mercenary, Effektor, Evil Masquerade, Manticora, and Ad Noctum.

Discography

With The World State 
Flier EP – 2013
"A Castle for the Battles that I Fight" (single) – 2013

With Sinphonia 
When the Tide Breaks – 2000
The Divine Disharmony – 2002
Silence (EP) – 2005

With Sirenia 
Nine Destinies and a Downfall – 2007

Singles 
My Mind's Eye

Music videos
My Mind's Eye
The Other Side

Guest appearances 
Mercenary – 11 Dreams (2004)
Evil Masquerade – Theatrical Madness (2005)

References

External links
Monika Pedersen's blog
Sirenia official website
The World State official site

1978 births
Living people
Danish heavy metal singers
20th-century Danish painters
21st-century Danish painters
Women heavy metal singers
Singers from Aarhus
People from Skanderborg Municipality
Danish sopranos
English-language singers from Denmark
20th-century Danish male singers
21st-century Danish women singers